"Wish I Didn't Have to Miss You" is a song written by Hank Cochran and Dave Kirby. It was originally and released as a duet by American country music artists Jack Greene and Jeannie Seely. Released in 1969, the song became a major hit on the country charts in early 1970.

Background and release
"Wish I Didn't Have to Miss You" was written by Seely's husband at the time, Hank Cochran along with Dave Kirby. As a duet team, Greene and Seely recorded the song at Bradley's Barn, a studio owned by producer Owen Bradley. The track was officially recorded in July 1969 with Bradley producing the record.

"Wish I Didn't Have to Miss You" was released as a single in October 1969 via Decca Records. The song peaked at number 2 on the Billboard Hot Country Singles chart in January 1970. It became Seely's second biggest hit as a recording artist and another major hit for Greene. It was later released on their studio album in 1970, Jack Greene, Jeannie Seely.

Track listings
7" vinyl single
 "Wish I Didn't Have to Miss You" – 2:08
 "My Tears Don't Show" – 2:52

Chart performance

Weekly charts

References

1969 songs
1969 singles
Decca Records singles
Jack Greene songs
Jeannie Seely songs
Song recordings produced by Owen Bradley
Songs written by Hank Cochran